Jermaine Junior Jones (born November 3, 1981) is an American former professional soccer player who played as a defensive midfielder.

Born in Germany to an American father and German mother, he came up through the German club system and represented Germany at the U21 and senior level. However, he was not a regular in the team. He later filed for a switch to the United States. He made his debut for them in 2010 and played at the 2014 FIFA World Cup, scoring a notable goal against Portugal.

Early life 

Jones was born in Frankfurt and grew up in the city district of Bonames. His father is an African American former soldier for the U.S. Army who was stationed in West Germany and his mother is an ethnic German. As a child, Jones lived in Chicago, Illinois and Greenwood, Mississippi, before his parents divorced and he returned to Germany with his mother.

Club career

Early career 

Jones started his youth career at SV Bonames, moving to FV Bad Vilbel in 1994, at 12.

Eintracht Frankfurt 

In 1995, he was recruited by Eintracht Frankfurt to play in their academy. He spent the next five years learning and building the quality of his game, and made his first appearance in the Eintracht Frankfurt II team in the 2000–01 season making 25 appearances and scoring eight goals. He made the step up to the main squad in 2001. Jones made 46 appearances for the Frankfurt senior team over two years in the 2001–2003 seasons, scoring seven goals as he was primarily played as a central defensive midfielder.

Bayer Leverkusen 

His good form at the time saw him purchased by Bayer Leverkusen. First team chances were scarce though, so he played the majority of the 2004–05 Bundesliga season for Bayer Leverkusen II.

Eintracht Frankfurt

Second spell; loan 

Jones re-signed for Eintracht Frankfurt on loan, barely six months after signing for Bayer Leverkusen. He made fourteen appearances and scored three goals.

Third spell; permanent deal 

Before the start of the 2005–06 season, he signed a permanent deal with the Hesse based team. However, during that season, Jones suffered a serious leg injury that required surgery, and was out of the game for eight months, only returning in the first half of the last game of the season. Over the next two seasons, Jones shed his "teen idol" image, and established himself as a quality player and became captain of the squad.

In March 2007, Jones announced on the official Eintracht bulletin board that he would not extend his contract expiring at the end of the 2006–07 season. This enraged many Eintracht supporters, as Jones canceled a contract negotiation with chairman Heribert Bruchhagen a few days before it was scheduled to take place. In October 2006, he already had defended himself for turning down a contract offer, underlining he wanted to stay after all the management of the Eagles had done for him during his injuries. This led to him joining Schalke 04.

Schalke 04 

The following three seasons at Schalke 04 were relatively mixed for Jones, with his career being hit further by injuries including a muscular hairline crack injury which kept him out of the team for the majority of the 2009–10 season. However, he did enjoy his best stint playing regular games for the first time in his career playing 70 games in three seasons. The beginning of the 2010–11 season was again frustrating for Jones through lack of games, and after a falling out with team manager Felix Magath, he was sent to train with the reserves and made available for transfer.

Blackburn Rovers (loan) 

On January 14, 2011, it was revealed that English Premier League team Blackburn Rovers were interested in taking Jones on loan with a view to making the signing permanent at the end of the season. With Rovers player Vince Grella's time at Rovers blighted by regular injury, the club had been looking for a defensive addition for some time, and Jones was thought to be an excellent addition to a newly developed squad under new Rovers manager Steve Kean. On January 15, Kean confirmed a deal would take place in the next week.

On January 18, 2011, it was confirmed by the club that Jones had signed on loan until the end of the season. He made his Premier League debut on January 23, 2011, starting in a 2–0 home win over West Bromwich Albion at Ewood Park and completed the full 90 minutes, receiving the man-of-the-match award on his first appearance for the club. On April 30, 2011, Jones put in another man-of-the-match display, playing the full 90 minutes in the derby game against Bolton Wanderers in a 1–0 win at Ewood Park.  On May 22, 2011, against Wolverhampton Wanderers at Molineux, he completed the full 90 minutes in the last league match of the season in a 3–2 win for Rovers. He made 15 Premier League starts for Rovers and picked up eight yellow cards in total, becoming a firm fans favorite in the process.

Return to Schalke 04 

Following impressive performances with Blackburn, it was thought that he would extend his stay, but the two clubs could not agree a fee and he returned to Schalke 04 in July. In 2011, Schalke 04 appointed a new manager Ralf Rangnick and the new coach announced that he would give Jones a chance to stay at the club and fight for his spot because his contract runs until 2014 and guarantees the midfielder €12 million. Following his return from Blackburn, Jones became an integral part in defensive midfield and became an ever-present in the starting XI helping Schalke 04 fight for a Champions League berth and into the quarterfinals of the Europa League against Athletic Bilbao. In the club's second leg match against FC Twente in the Round of 16 on March 15, Jones scored a goal and provided an assist for one of Klaas-Jan Huntelaar's goals as Schalke 04 ran out 4–1 winners to overturn a 1–0 away defeat in the first leg.

On April 21, 2012, Jones got in a training round bust up with Dutch striker Klaas-Jan Huntelaar; the two traded blows and were then sent by general manager Horst Heldt to run extra laps around the field.  The following day in a match against Augsburg that finished 1–1, Jones was accused of cheating because of rolling on the ground and clutching his face following a high challenge that only nicked his hand;  his play acting was then compared to Rivaldo's infamous effort against Turkey at the World Cup in 2002. The following weekend, on April 28, Jones played 85 minutes in a 4–0 defeat of Hertha Berlin which certified Schalke's position in third spot and secured automatic qualification into the group stages of next year's Champions League.

Jones appeared in the Bundesliga 20 times during the 2011–12 season, making his last appearance in a 3–2 win over Werder Bremen on the final day of the season, playing the full 90 minutes. Following three games in the first two weeks of October in which Jones was a second-half substitute, two Bundesliga games and one Europa League fixture, Jones started every game in which he appeared, going the full 90 in almost all of them.

After picking up a yellow card which would rule Jones out for the return leg, he netted a well taken equalizer in Schalke 04's 1–1 draw with Galatasaray in the Champions League Round of 16 clash on February 20, 2013.

Beşiktaş 

On January 30, 2014, he joined Turkish Süper Lig club Beşiktaş on a contract until the end of the season.

New England Revolution 

On August 24, 2014, Jones agreed to terms with Major League Soccer, becoming a designated player on a salary of $4.7 million for 18 months. MLS held a blind draw between the Chicago Fire and New England Revolution to decide who would receive Jones' rights. New England won the draw, making Jones the fourth designated player in club history. He scored his first career MLS goal, a game-winner, against Sporting Kansas City on September 26, 2014. Jones and the New England Revolution made it to the MLS Cup 2014 in Carson, California, but lost to the LA Galaxy 2–1 after extra time.

Colorado Rapids 

After failing to agree on a new contract with New England, Jones was traded to Colorado Rapids on March 4, 2016 in exchange for a first-round selection in the 2017 MLS SuperDraft and general allocation money. On April 16, 2016 Jones made his Colorado Rapids debut and scored in a 2-1 win. Following three goals and two assists in four games, Jones was nominated for Major League Soccer's Player of the Month in April 2016.

LA Galaxy 

On December 13, 2016, it was announced that LA Galaxy had acquired Jones' MLS rights in exchange for the Galaxy's first-round pick in the 2017 MLS SuperDraft and a second-round pick in the 2018 MLS SuperDraft. He was officially announced as a Galaxy player on January 18, 2017. His contract option was declined at the end of the season. Jones is reportedly looking at playing and coaching in Europe.

Ventura County Fusion 
On July 14, 2018, Jones started and played all 90 minutes of Ventura County Fusion's USL PDL regular season finale against FC Golden State Force.

Ontario Fury 
Jones returned to professional football on March 12, 2019, signing for the Ontario Fury of the Major Arena Soccer League. Jones joined the Fury just weeks after Landon Donovan signed with the San Diego Sockers. On February 20, 2020, Jones announced his retirement from playing professionally.

Coaching career 

He served as head coach of the Real So Cal U19 academy team in 2018.

International career 

Jones broke through into the Eintracht Frankfurt squad, became a German Under-21 international and briefly became a fan favorite in Frankfurt.

Though Jones played four matches with Germany's Under 21 team, he was often left out of the senior team, save a few friendlies with mostly reserves. In June 2009, Jones declared to the media that he would be available to play for the United States after it was clear to him that the German national team manager, Joachim Löw, did not have any plans for him in the current German set-up. Jones was eligible based on a new FIFA ruling allowing players to switch their national teams if the player had not yet played in an official FIFA match with the senior team despite having played at the youth level. Jones was eligible for the United States due to his dual German and American nationality.

On October 20, 2009, Jones was cleared by FIFA to join the United States national team. He first met with Bob Bradley and the national team during a March 2010 training camp and reportedly fit in "really well" according to Tim Howard. In the end, Jones did not recover from injury in time for the World Cup. On August 4, 2010, Jones was called into the United States squad for an August 10 friendly against Brazil. The next day, however, he withdrew from the squad due to fitness concerns related to his injury from the previous season. Jones was included on the roster for the U.S. national team's friendlies against Poland and Colombia in October. He made his debut for the United States against Poland and assisted Jozy Altidore on the game's opening goal in the 13th minute.

On June 19, 2011, Jones scored his first international goal in the 2011 CONCACAF Gold Cup against Jamaica. On January 21, 2012, he captained the side in the 1–0 win over Venezuela in a friendly match. On May 26, 2012, Jones scored his second international goal in a 5–1 victory over Scotland in a friendly match.

On June 16, 2014, Jones made his FIFA World Cup debut by starting and playing 90 minutes in a 2–1 victory over Ghana. In the next group stage game, with the U.S. down 1–0 against Portugal, Jones scored the equalizing goal with a curling strike from 25 yards out. The game ended in a 2–2 draw. Despite a 1–0 loss to Jones' native Germany in the final group stage match, the U.S. advanced to the round of 16. The U.S. were eventually eliminated in the knockout stage by Belgium 2–1.

In May 2016, he was among the 40 players selected for the U.S. 2016 Copa America preliminary roster and went on to be named the Man of the Match following a win against Costa Rica. Jones was the highest rated player for the U.S. for the Copa América Centenario in June 2016.

International goals

Personal life 

He married Sarah Gerthe in 2007. Together they have five children: Keanu, Liya-Joelle, Kenyon, Junius, and Jadee-Mae.

Gerthe filed a restraining order against Jones in early 2019, claiming he followed her around town and sent her "inappropriate, antagonistic and degrading messages." The couple filed for divorce in July 2019.

In 2018, a restraining order was filed against Jones by actor David Charvet who alleged that Jones stalked him and sent him threatening text messages.

He is a good friend of the former female soccer player and former manager of the German female national soccer team Steffi Jones, who is also a German-American dual national and the child of an African American soldier. They both played for the same club, SV Bonames, albeit not at the same time. The two are not related.

Career statistics

Ref.:

See also
 German-Americans

References

External links 

 
 
 

1981 births
2. Bundesliga players
2011 CONCACAF Gold Cup players
2014 FIFA World Cup players
African-American soccer players
American people of German descent
American soccer players
American expatriate sportspeople in Turkey
Association football midfielders
Bayer 04 Leverkusen II players
Bayer 04 Leverkusen players
Beşiktaş J.K. footballers
Blackburn Rovers F.C. players
Bundesliga players
Colorado Rapids players
Copa América Centenario players
Designated Players (MLS)
Dual internationalists (football)
Eintracht Frankfurt II players
Eintracht Frankfurt players
Expatriate footballers in Turkey
FC Schalke 04 players
German footballers
German people of African-American descent
German people of American descent
Sportspeople of American descent
German expatriate sportspeople in Turkey
Germany B international footballers
Germany international footballers
Germany under-21 international footballers
Germany youth international footballers
Living people
Major League Soccer All-Stars
Major League Soccer players
New England Revolution players
Citizens of the United States through descent
Premier League players
Süper Lig players
Footballers from Frankfurt
United States men's international soccer players
Ventura County Fusion players
Ontario Fury players
Major Arena Soccer League players
21st-century African-American sportspeople
20th-century African-American people